Bayındır is a district of İzmir Province, Turkey.

Bayındır may also refer to:

People
 Altay Bayındır (born 1998), Turkish footballer
 Sevahir Bayındır (born 1969), Turkish politician

Places
 Bayındır Dam, a dam in Ankara Province, Turkey
 Bayındır railway station, a railway station in Bayındır, Turkey
 Bayındır, Aksaray, a village in the district of Aksaray, Aksaray Province
 Bayındır, Bismil
 Bayındır, Burdur
 Bayındır, Büyükorhan
 Bayındır, Çamlıdere, a village in the district of Çamlıdere, Ankara Province
 Bayındır, Çankırı
 Bayındır, Çat
 Bayındır, Çerkeş
 Bayındır, Elmalı, a village in the district of Elmalı, Antalya Province
 Bayındır, Göynük, a village in the district of Göynük, Bolu Province
 Bayındır, İznik
 Bayındır, Keban
 Bayındır, Kastamonu, a village in the district of Kastamonu, Kastamonu Province
 Bayındır, Kaş, a village in the district of Kaş, Antalya Province
 Bayındır, Mecitözü
 Bayındır, Nazilli, a village in the district of Nazilli, Aydın Province
 Bayındır, Pazaryolu
 Bayındır, Silifke, a village in Silifke district of Mersin Province

See also
 Bayandur (tribe), also known as Bayındır

Turkish-language surnames